Albert Oliphant Stewart (16 July 1884 – 3 April 1958) was a notable New Zealand tribal leader, law clerk, interpreter, local politician, rate collector. Of Māori descent, he identified with the Ngāti Awa and Te Whānau-ā-Apanui iwi. He was born in Whakatane, Bay of Plenty, New Zealand in 1884. He was a member of the Whakatane Borough Council (1917–1919) and the Whakatane Harbour Board (1923–1931).

References

1884 births
1958 deaths
New Zealand Māori public servants
People from Whakatāne
Ngāti Awa people
Te Whānau-ā-Apanui people
Māori politicians
New Zealand city councillors